"Heart of the World" is a song by Scottish rock band Big Country, which was released in 1990 as a non-album single. It was written by Stuart Adamson and produced by Tim Palmer. "Heart of the World" reached No. 50 on the UK Singles Chart and remained in the Top 100 for three weeks.

The song's music video was directed by Howard Greenhalgh. In 1991, Adamson picked it as his favourite Big Country video.

Background
During March 1990, Big Country spent time recording two new songs, "Save Me" and "Heart of the World", at Livingston Studios in London. The tracks that would emerge as B-Sides on the singles were recorded at Chipping Norton Studios in Oxford during the same month. As drummer Mark Brzezicki had left the band in 1989, the sessions featured Pat Ahern on drums.

"Save Me" was released as a single in April 1990 and reached No. 41 in the UK. It was followed by "Heart of the World" in June, which reached No. 50 in the UK. The band originally wanted "Heart of the World" to be released as the first single of the two, but the band's label, Mercury, opted for "Save Me" instead. "Heart of the World", unlike "Save Me", was not included on the band's compilation album Through a Big Country: Greatest Hits (1990).

Speaking of "Heart of the World", Tony Butler told the Aberdeen Evening Express in July 1990: "It's a simple song about belief in oneself. Throughout time people have followed guidelines set by heroes, and that's a positive human attitude we want to encourage."

Reception
Upon its release, Louise Philip of The Press and Journal gave the single three stars and commented: "Sounding more raw than usual, the only real letdown is the guitar solo which sounds too much like "One Great Thing"." David Ewen of the Aberdeen Evening Express described "Heart of the World" as "a strong song, rendered in [Big Country's] own inimitable style". Jon Homer, reviewing the single for Channel 4's Teletext service, described the song as "another slice of anthemic guitar rock that manages to be as powerful as the loudest heavy metal band, but several times more effective and intelligent". He predicted the song would be a "minor hit perhaps".

Track listing
7" and cassette single
"Heart of the World" - 4:41
"Black Skinned Blue Eyed Boys" - 3:21

12" single
"Heart of the World" - 4:41
"Black Skinned Blue Eyed Boys" - 3:21
"Troubled Man" - 4:21

12" single (limited edition)
"Heart of the World" - 4:41
"Peace in Our Time" (Acoustic) - 3:06
"Thirteen Valleys" (Acoustic) - 3:59

CD single
"Heart of the World" - 4:41
"Black Skinned Blue Eyed Boys" - 3:21
"Restless Natives" - 4:21

Personnel
Big Country
Stuart Adamson - vocals, guitar
Bruce Watson - guitar
Tony Butler - bass
Pat Ahern - drums

Production
Tim Palmer - producer of "Heart of the World"
Big Country - producers of "Black Skinned Blue Eyed Boys" and "Troubled Man"
Geoff Emerick - producer of "Restless Natives"
 Stuart Adamson - producer of "Restless Natives", "Peace in Our Time" and "Thirteen Valleys"

Other
 Zarkowski Designs - artwork

Charts

References

1990 songs
1990 singles
Mercury Records singles
Big Country songs
Songs written by Stuart Adamson
Music videos directed by Howard Greenhalgh